Visana, based in Bern, is a Swiss insurance company specializing in health insurance and accident insurance. The company group serves more than 570,000 basic insured individuals. In total, it includes about 1.2 million insured individuals and, in 2014, achieved a premium income of 2.9 billion Swiss francs with 1,290 employees.

Areas of activity 
The Group has a holding structure with the Visana Plus Foundation as the umbrella of the Group, as well as the four subsidiary companies Visana AG, Visana Versicherungen AG, sana24 AG and vivacare AG operating in the insurance area.

The Visana Group is one of the largest Swiss health and accident insurers. It offers compulsory health insurance according to health insurance law, supplementary and non-life insurance according to insurance contract law and accident insurance according to accident insurance law.

The company insures private customers (individuals and families) as well as corporate clients (companies, public institutions and associations). For the latter, it offers wage loss and accident insurance.

Since 2020, Visana has been the first Swiss health insurer to offer a Same Day Delivery Service, in cooperation with Medi 24, the telemedical competence center.

History 
The company emerged in 1996 as a result of the fusion of the three health insurance funds KKB (founded 1870), Grütli (founded 1872) and Evidenzia (founded 1990) with the implementation of the new health insurance law.

In 1998 the company made headlines in eight cantons. In reaction to this, the Federal Department of the Interior announced that it would "prevent Visana to be withdrawn from basic health insurance in individual cantons."

In 2012 Visanas subsidiary company Vivacare took over the basic insurance business of the Bernese insurance group Innova.

In 2019 Angelo Eggli, former managing director of Allianz Partners Schweiz, was elected as CEO and replaced Valeria Trachsel.

References

External links 
 Visana Group

Financial services companies established in 1996
Insurance companies of Switzerland
1996 establishments in Switzerland